This is a list of the complete operas of the Italian composer Giuseppe Sarti (1729–1802).

List

References
DiChiera, David and McClymonds, Marita P (1992), "Sarti, Giuseppe" in The New Grove Dictionary of Opera, ed. Stanley Sadie (London) 

 
Lists of operas by composer
Lists of compositions by composer